The Florida–Georgia football rivalry  is an American college football rivalry game played annually by the University of Florida Gators and the University of Georgia Bulldogs, both members of the Eastern Division of the Southeastern Conference. The programs first met in 1904 or 1915 (the status of the first game is disputed) and have played every season since 1926 except for a war-time interruption in 1943. It is one of the most prominent rivalry games in college football, and it has been held in Jacksonville, Florida since 1933, with only two exceptions, making it one of the few remaining neutral-site rivalries in college football. The game attracts huge crowds to Jacksonville, and the associated tailgating and other events earned it the nickname of the "World's Largest Outdoor Cocktail Party", although that name is no longer used officially.

Though highly contested on both sides, the series has gone through several periods in which one team has been dominant for well over a decade. Georgia dominated the early series while Florida held a clear advantage in the 1950s and early 1960s. Georgia again dominated from the mid-60s through the 80s under coach Vince Dooley, while Florida took the upper hand in the rivalry during the 1990s and early 2000s under coaches Steve Spurrier and Urban Meyer. More recently, the series has been more evenly balanced. Beginning with the 2007 contest, the fierce rivals enjoyed and then suffered through alternating sets of three-game win streaks. That trend ended in 2020, with Florida winning in 2020 and Georgia winning in 2021 and 2022.

Series history

Disputed beginnings
The two universities do not agree on when their gridiron rivalry began.  The University of Georgia's athletic department considers a 52–0 victory in 1904 against a school known as the University of Florida to be part of the series. However, this was not the modern University of Florida in Gainesville, but one of its four predecessor institutions: a school based in Lake City that was known as Florida Agricultural College before 1903.  Florida's University Athletic Association does not include this game in the series record as it occurred before the modern university was established by the Florida Legislature with the Buckman Act of 1905 and before the new school in Gainesville fielded its first football team in 1906. UGA sports historian Dan Magill sums up Georgia's attitude: "That's where Florida was back then. We can't help it if they got run out of Lake City."

The first game in the rivalry acknowledged by both schools took place in Jacksonville in 1915. The series has been played annually since 1926 except in 1943, when Florida did not field a team due to World War II.

Series trends
Georgia dominated the early rivalry. Florida did not score a single point against the Bulldogs until their fifth (or sixth) meeting. The Gators won their first two games against Georgia in 1928 and 1929, when coach Charlie Bachman's squads briefly brought Florida's football program to national prominence. However, after a scoreless tie in 1930, Georgia resumed its dominance, winning fifteen out of the next seventeen games in the series as coach Wally Butts led the Bulldogs to several SEC championships while the Gators suffered through a period of mediocrity in the 1930s and 1940s. Florida finally enjoyed longer-term success in the rivalry in the 1950s under coach Bob Woodruff, a trend that continued into the 1960s under coach Ray Graves. The hiring of new Georgia coach Vince Dooley in 1964 evened the rivalry for the remainder of the decade, and in the 1970s and 1980s, his Bulldog squads usually won the game in Jacksonville while winning a national championship in 1980 along the way. Coach Steve Spurrier's arrival in Gainesville turned the rivalry back around beginning in 1990, and his Gator squads went 11–1 against the Bulldogs. Coach Urban Meyer continued Florida's winning trend through the mid-2000s, but the rivalry has been unusually even since 2008. Florida began a three game series win streak in that season, which was followed by a three game Georgia streak, then another three game streak for Florida, which was answered by three Georgia wins, marking the longest evenly-divided dozen years in series history.

Since the 1960s, the Florida–Georgia rivalry often held conference or national championship implications for one or both teams, and both schools have had title hopes dashed in the game, sometimes in a surprising upset. In 1966, the Bulldogs intercepted 3 passes by eventual Heisman Trophy winner Steve Spurrier, derailing the Gators' title hopes in a 27–10 upset. On the other hand, Florida's upset win over Georgia in 2002 was the Bulldogs' only loss of the season and likely cost them a chance to play for a national championship. The rivalry has taken on even more importance since the SEC split into divisions in 1992. Both teams were placed in the SEC East, meaning that the contest has often decided who will play in the SEC Championship Game. To date, Florida has fifteen Eastern Division titles while Georgia has twelve.

Site of game 
The Florida–Georgia game has often been held at off-campus sites since the very beginning of the rivalry. Florida's first on-campus stadium. Fleming Field, was quite small, so Florida's early teams usually played "home" games against major college opposition somewhere other than Gainesville. Before 1930, Florida-Georgia contests were held in Jacksonville (three times), Savannah (twice), and Tampa (once), along with several Georgia home games in Athens. (The disputed 1904 game was played in Macon, Georgia, another neutral site.)

Florida Field opened in 1930, and the rivals played in Gainesville for the first time in 1931, followed the next season by a return to Athens. From 1933 onward, the game has been played in Jacksonville except for a home and home set in 1994 and 1995 when the old Gator Bowl stadium was being rebuilt for the expansion Jacksonville Jaguars of the NFL. In almost 100 meetings, the game has been played in Athens or Gainesville a total of only seven times, and there are no plans to do so in the future.

Playing the game at a neutral site rather than on their respective campuses provides the universities' athletic programs with more revenue from the game than if the site rotated on a "home-and-away" basis.  As of the 2018 contest, the universities made $3.3 million every year, or $6.6 million every two years, which is far more than the schools would earn if the game alternated between their respective home stadiums. In addition, the city of Jacksonville agreed in 2019 to compensate the schools for the loss of a home game by paying each university $1 million per year plus travel expenses beginning in 2020.

There have been occasional calls to move the game from Jacksonville, usually when either Georgia or Florida is dominating the rivalry. In 2018, Georgia coach Kirby Smart pointed out that the neutral site game cost both programs a valuable recruiting weekend every other year, a view that Florida coach Dan Mullen said that he "respected". However, the schools have continued to renew their contract since it makes financial sense for both schools to keep the game in Jacksonville. For example, despite vocal calls to move the game to Atlanta or make it a home-and-home contest after Florida went on a 16–3 run in the series, Georgia's athletic board unanimously agreed in 2009 to a six-year contract to keep the game in Jacksonville through 2016. The most recent contract extension keeps the game in Jacksonville until at least 2023 with an option for two more years.

The game weekend is also extremely lucrative for Jacksonville businesses, particularly in the downtown area, with many reporting that it is their busiest weekend of the year. In addition to being important to the city of Jacksonville, the Georgia Golden Isles also depend on the game to sustain businesses through the winter season as many Georgia students and alumni elect to spend the weekend on the Georgia Coast, particularly on Saint Simons Island, where thousands of Georgia students gather each year at the aptly named "Frat Beach" on Friday before commuting to Jacksonville the next day.

The designated "home" team alternates from year to year, and ticket distribution is split evenly between the fans of the two teams. Beginning in the late 1980s, fans from Florida and Georgia were assigned seats grouped in alternating sections of the stadium to minimize incidents, and the contrasting colors worn by the fans (red and black for Georgia, orange and blue for Florida) created a "beach ball" visual effect in the stands.  More recently, the seating arrangement has split the stadium lengthwise and fans sit on the side corresponding to the sideline their team occupies. The teams take turns serving as the "home" team, with the "hosts" usually wearing their home uniforms and the visitors wearing white road jerseys. However, on several occasions, the Bulldogs and Gators have faced off with both squads wearing their home uniforms.

Rivalry traditions

"World's Largest Outdoor Cocktail Party"
The game is one of the busiest annual events in downtown Jacksonville, and attracts huge crowds that congregate around the stadium for tailgating and other happenings, particularly at the Jacksonville Landing, a riverfront plaza facing the St. Johns River. As a result the game and associated revelry have been known as "the World's Largest Outdoor Cocktail Party", a nickname first coined in the 1950s by Bill Kastelz, sports editor for The Florida Times-Union.  Kastelz claimed he came up with the name after seeing a drunk, stumbling fan offer an alcoholic beverage to an on-duty police officer.  The "Cocktail Party" nickname proved so popular that the City of Jacksonville used it for many years.  However, the city dropped it from most official usage in 1988 following a series of alcohol-fueled outbursts. In 1984, Florida fans stormed the field and tore down the goal posts after a 27–0 victory; the following year, a 24–3 Georgia win led Bulldogs fans to do the same, ultimately resulting in 65 arrests.  Thereafter, the city cracked down on excessive drinking and soon dropped its use of the name.  In 2006 both schools and the Southeastern Conference asked CBS and the city to abandon the name in promotions due to concerns about alcohol abuse by students and other attendees.

Since 2006, the rivalry has lacked an official name.  It is generally called the "Florida–Georgia game" or "FLA/GA" in Florida, or "Georgia–Florida game" in Georgia; some entities, including the Jacksonville newspaper The Florida Times-Union, rotate the name each year to list the designated home team first. Since 2009, the respective student government associations of the institutions have referred to the game as the War for the Oar, as the winning team takes home the Okefenokee Oar.

Florida–Georgia Hall of Fame
The Jacksonville Economic Development Commission created the Florida–Georgia Hall of Fame in 1995 to recognize the players, coaches, and other representatives from each school who have made their mark on the rivalry.  Each year, four new members (two from each school) are announced in June, and are formally inducted at a luncheon in Jacksonville the Friday before the football game.  Florida–Georgia Hall of Fame inductees through 2019 include:

Florida: Carlos Alvarez, Reidel Anthony, Kerwin Bell, Howell Boney, Scot Brantley, Joe Brodsky, Alex Brown, Norm Carlson, Kevin Carter, Rick Casares, Jeff Chandler, Wes Chandler, Brad Culpepper, Doug Dickey, Chris Doering, Jimmy Dunn, Larry Dupree, Jeremy Foley, Don Gaffney, Jabar Gaffney, Ray Graves, Rex Grossman, Galen Hall, Percy Harvin, Ike Hilliard, Chuck Hunsinger, Lindy Infante, Willie Jackson, Jr., Doug Johnson, Jevon Kearse, Charlie LaPradd, Chris Leak, Buford Long, Wilber Marshall, Shane Matthews, Lee McGriff, Nat Moore, Ricky Nattiel, John Reaves, Errict Rhett, Lito Sheppard, Brandon Spikes, Steve Spurrier, Fred Taylor, Tim Tebow, Richard Trapp, Ben Troupe, John L. Williams, Lawrence Wright, Danny Wuerffel, Jack Youngblood.

Georgia: Peter Anderson, Richard Appleby, Buck Belue, Boss Bailey, John Brantley, Zeke Bratkowski, Charley Britt, Kevin Butler, Wally Butts, Mike Cavan, Knox Culpepper, Rennie Curran,  Vince Dooley, Robert Edwards, Bob Etter, Randall Godfrey, Ray Goff, Cy Grant, David Greene, Rodney Hampton, Garrison Hearst, Terry Hoage, Jarvis Jones, Dan Magill, Kevin McLee, Willie McClendon, Knowshon Moreno, Larry Munson, Aaron Murray, George Patton, David Pollack, John Rauch, Rex Robinson, Matt Robinson, Erk Russell, Bill Saye, Jake Scott, Lindsay Scott, Richard Seymour, Frank Sinkwich, Bill Stanfill, Matt Stinchcomb, Marcus Stroud, Tommy Thurson, Charley Trippi, Herschel Walker, Gene Washington, Charles Wittemore, Scott Woerner, Tim Worley, Eric Zeier.

In 2017, two members were inducted who were not linked with one particular school: Greg McGarity, who was a long-serving athletic administrator at Florida before becoming Georgia's athletic director, and Verne Lundquist, a retired broadcaster who was the television play-by-play announcer for many Florida-Georgia games as part of SEC on CBS coverage.

Okefenokee Oar

Unlike many college sports rivalries, the Florida–Georgia game historically has not been played for a trophy. The city of Jacksonville announced that it would award the winning teams the goalposts from the game in 1986, in order to persuade fans not to storm the field and destroy them as they had the previous two years.  However, no goalposts were ever given out because neither university wanted them.

In 2009, the student governments of the two universities announced the creation of a new trophy, the "Okefenokee Oar".  The 10-foot-long Oar was donated anonymously to the University of Florida in 2009, and has opposing sides carved with symbols and logos from each school.  The Oar was carved from the remains of a 1,000-year-old cypress tree that once grew in the Okefenokee Swamp, which straddles the Florida–Georgia border and was the source of an interstate boundary dispute.  Beginning with the 2009 contest, the Okefenokee Oar is presented to the winning university's student body president.  No trophy is presented at the game, however.

Notable games 

As with all intense rivalries, the Florida/Georgia series has seen many memorable games that simultaneously brought joy and anguish to partisans of the schools.

1928: Ending the drought 

When Charlie Bachman became the 1928 Gators' new head coach, he inherited a team loaded with talent recruited by his predecessor, Harold Sebring.  However, he also inherited a program which had never come close to beating the Georgia Bulldogs, their Southern Intercollegiate Athletic Association rival. Georgia was 6–0 against Florida with five shutouts and an overall scoring advantage of 190–9.

The teams met again in Savannah, Georgia on November 10, and Bachman's Gators finally beat the Bulldogs through the efforts of Florida's "Phantom Four" backfield of Dale Van Sickle, Carl Brumbaugh, Rainey Cawthon, Clyde Crabtree and Royce Goodbread. With Florida holding a commanding lead in fourth quarter, jubilant Gator fans prematurely rushed the field to tear down the goal posts, resulting in fist fights breaking out between supporters of the two schools. Order was restored, the game was completed, and Florida earned its first victory in the series by the score of 26–6.

1941: Sinkwich beats Florida with a broken jaw 

Georgia's All-American back Frank Sinkwich had broken his jaw in a game earlier in the season, but that didn't keep him off the field. Wearing a custom-made chinstrap attached to his helmet, Sinkwich ran 31 times for 142 and two touchdowns and kicked Georgia's first field goal since 1924 in the Bulldogs' 19–3 victory over the Gators. When speaking about the loss after the game, Florida coach Tom Lieb simply said "Too much Sinkwich."

1942: 75 and oh! 

Having lost most upper-class players and several members of the coaching staff to service in World War II, the 1942 Florida Gators brought an inexperienced 3–4 squad into Jacksonville for the 1942 contest with Georgia.  The Bulldogs, on the other hand, still had the services of many key contributors thanks to draft deferments issued to players enrolled in the University of Georgia's ROTC program, and brought a 7–0 record and No. 1 ranking to Jacksonville.

Georgia halfback Charley Trippi and Heisman Trophy-winning back Frank Sinkwich combined to score seven touchdowns as Georgia defeated Florida 75–0, the largest margin in series history.  The Bulldogs finished the regular season 10–1, won the Southeastern Conference championship, defeated the UCLA Bruins 9–0 in the Rose Bowl, and were named national champions by multiple polls and ratings services. Meanwhile, the depleted Gators would not win another game on the season, and when even more students and staff joined the war effort, the school did not field a football team at all in 1943.

1949: Hunsinger ends Georgia's streak 

The post–World War II 1940s were a tough slog for the Florida Gators.  Coached by Raymond Wolf, the Gators' collection of recent high school graduates and returning war veterans suffered the indignity of four consecutive losing seasons—the lowest point in the history of the Gators football program, ironically remembered by the close-knit players as the "Golden Era."  But there were still stars and bright moments; Wolf's 1949 Florida Gators were led by senior lineman Jimmy Kynes and running back Chuck Hunsinger.  Given little chance by anyone to beat coach Wally Butts' Georgia Bulldogs in Jacksonville, Kynes inspired his two-way linemen to their outstanding effort of the season, stopping the Bulldogs' running game on defense, and blocking for Hunsinger on offense.  Hunsinger rushed eighteen times for 174 yards and three touchdowns, and the Gators won 28–7, breaking a seven-game Georgia winning streak. Wolf would be dismissed as Florida's head coach at the end of the season, but on that day in Jacksonville, he was jubilantly carried off the field by his players.

1952: 30–0 
Georgia clearly dominated the first several decades of their series against Florida. Coming into the 1952 contest, the Bulldogs were 23–5–1 all-time against the Gators and had won nine of the previous ten meetings, including two straight victories over Florida coach Bob Woodruff.

The Gators arrived in Jacksonville with a 3–2 record and an offense that had struggled against good defenses. In an attempt to jump-start their run-oriented attack, Woodruff and Florida offensive coordinator Frank Broyles decided to swap the positions of quarterback Rick Casares and running back Doug Dickey. Casares had been heavily recruited by Georgia but thought that Bulldog Coach Wally Butts was "too rough" with his players during a recruiting visit, so he opted to attend Florida instead.

Led by All-American lineman Charlie LaPradd on defense and Casares on offense and special teams (he was also the team's place-kicker), the Gators dominated the Bulldogs 30–0 in Jacksonville, which would remain the Gators' largest victory over the Bulldogs for almost forty years and was the first shutout over the Bulldogs since 1937. Casares ran for 108 yards and two touchdowns and kicked three extra points and a field goal, while halfback Buford Long ran for 116 yards on 10 carries.

Florida finished the season 8–3 and were invited to their first major bowl game, the 1953 Gator Bowl. Georgia finished 7–4 and went on to suffer through several sub-par seasons in the 1950s, helping Florida earn a winning decade over their border rivals for first time in the series.

1964: Vince Dooley arrives 

While Georgia still held an overall advantage in the series, Florida enjoyed a 10–2 streak from 1952 to 1963 under head coaches Bob Woodruff and Ray Graves.  That changed with the arrival of Vince Dooley as the new head coach of the underdog 1964 Georgia Bulldogs.  In a game where the Bulldogs' quarterback failed to complete a single pass and was intercepted twice, Dooleys' 'Dogs relied on their running game, a staunch second-half defense, and a little bit of luck to beat Graves' tenth-ranked Florida Gators.  With the game tied at 7–7 in the fourth quarter, Bulldogs placekicker Bob Etter lined up for a potential game-winning field goal.  Instead, in a wild broken play, the Bulldogs' center and placeholder mishandled the snap, but Etter picked up the bobbled ball and ran it for a touchdown to score the winning points in the 14–7 contest.

Dooley's teams would split their first seven games 3–3–1 against Graves' Gators.  Thereafter, Dooley's 'Dogs would go on to dominate the rivalry, winning fourteen of the nineteen games from 1971 to 1989.

1966: Heisman curse? 

The seventh-ranked 1966 Florida Gators entered the game with a 7–0 record and the opportunity to clinch a share of their first-ever SEC title.  The Gators' senior quarterback, Steve Spurrier, had just locked up the Heisman trophy the previous week with a stellar performance versus the Auburn Tigers.  The Florida–Georgia game turned out very differently, however, as the Bulldogs defense dominated the game, and Spurrier threw three interceptions in the 27–10 Georgia victory.  All-American defensive tackle Bill Stanfill would later reference Spurrier in recounting his experiences growing up on a farm in southwest Georgia before the advent of weightlifting: "Holding pigs for my dad to castrate was quite a challenge. I can't say that helped prepare me for football, but it sure did remind me an awful lot of sacking Steve Spurrier."

Spurrier returned to Gainesville as the Gators' head coach in 1990 and, with the sting of the 1966 loss in mind, emphasized the annual Florida–Georgia contest as the "biggest of the year." Under his tenure, the Gators were 11–1 against their bitter rivals.

1970: Rip, strip, and grip 

The 1970 Florida Gators featured All-American defensive end Jack Youngblood, and he pulled off one of the most remarkable plays in Florida football history.  With Bulldogs leading 17–10 and in possession of the ball at the Gators' two-yard line, Youngblood stood up Georgia back Ricky Lake short of the goal, forced a fumble and fell on the football.  "They ran a lead play to my side, and I cut it off", Youngblood said.  "I'm standing there holding the ballcarrier and I take the ball away from him, and gave it back to our offense."  Gators quarterback John Reaves and wide receiver Carlos Alvarez then connected for two touchdown passes in the final 5:13 to rally the Florida Gators to a 24–17 victory.

1975: Appleby to Washington 

The 1975 Florida Gators came into the game with a 6–1 record and No. 7 ranking, while the Georgia Bulldogs were 5–2 and ranked No. 19.  The Gators' offense was led by running back Tony Green, who ran an early one-yard touchdown to put the Gators ahead 7–0.  The Gators led 7–3 as time was winding down in the fourth quarter.  Georgia's "Junkyard Dawgs" defense allowed yards between the 20-yard-lines, but ceded little ground in the red zone.  The Bulldogs set up at their own 20-yard-line with 3:10 remaining, and head coach Vince Dooley did something he rarely did: he called a trick play.  Tight end Richard Appleby accepted the handoff on a reverse to the right, but instead of running downfield, he threw the ball to wide receiver Gene Washington for an improbable 80-yard touchdown play.  Florida mounted a drive in the closing minutes but a bad snap foiled the Gators' game-tying field goal attempt, and Georgia held on for a 10–7 victory.

1976: "Fourth and dumb" 

The 1976 Florida Gators were 6–1 and ranked No. 10 coming into the game, and again seeking to secure their first SEC football championship.  The Gators held a 27–13 halftime advantage and seemed to have the game in hand until the Bulldogs scored early in the third quarter to cut the lead to 27–20.  Then, faced with a fourth-and-one situation at the Gators' own 29-yard-line, coach Doug Dickey decided to go for the first down rather than punt.  Gators running back Earl Carr was stopped short by Bulldogs safety Johnny Henderson.  Led by quarterback Ray Goff's game management and running back Kevin McLee's 198-yard rushing performance, the Bulldogs seized the momentum and scored three touchdowns on their way to a 41–27 win.  After the game, Dickey admitted that "We were not outplayed; we were outcoached. I made some dumb calls."  Sports writers seized on Dickey's mea culpa, and in subsequent months and years popularized the phrase "fourth and dumb" to refer to both Dickey's failed fourth down attempt and the game itself.

1980: Run, Lindsay!

Trailing the underdog 1980 Florida Gators with their perfect season and their No. 2 ranking in jeopardy, the Bulldogs executed one of the most famous plays in college football history.  Georgia trailed 21–20 with less than a minute to play and faced third and long from their own 7-yard-line. Bulldog quarterback Buck Belue dropped back to pass and was forced to scramble around in his own endzone to avoid the Gator pass rush before finding wide receiver Lindsay Scott open in the middle of the field near the Georgia 25-yard-line. Scott caught the pass facing his own endzone, turned and darted diagonally through Florida's secondary, and outran everyone down the sideline to score the game-winning touchdown with only seconds left on the game clock.

Long-time Georgia radio announcer Larry Munson's legendary call of the play gave the game its nickname:

Florida in a stand-up five, they may or may not blitz.  Buck back, third down on the eight.  In trouble, he got a block behind him.  Gotta throw on the run.  Complete to the 25.  To the 30, Lindsay Scott 35, 40, Lindsay Scott 45, 50, 45, 40 . . .  Run Lindsay, 25, 20, 15, 10, 5, Lindsay Scott!  Lindsay Scott!  Lindsay Scott!

The improbable 93-yard pass play sealed the Bulldogs' 26–21 victory, and kept Georgia's national championship hopes alive.  The Bulldogs moved to No. 1 in the next round of polls and would go on to win the 1980 consensus national championship.

1981: "Herschel over the top!" 

Much like the previous year, the favored Georgia Bulldogs trailed the Florida Gators in the fourth quarter 21-20.  Backed up on their own five yard line with eight minutes remaining in the fourth quarter, the Bulldogs methodically marched 95 yards on 17 plays, mostly on the ground. The drive culminated in three straight hand-offs to running back Herschel Walker in which he attempted to jump over the line into the endzone, finally succeeding on third down. Florida still had 2 minutes to score but turned over the ball on downs near midfield, and Georgia won 26–21 for the second year in a row.

1984: Bell to Nattiel 

After suffering several defeats to the Bulldogs with a conference championship at stake, coach Galen Hall's 1984 Florida Gators entered the contest undefeated in the SEC.  The Gators dominated early, building a 17–0 lead by early in the second half.  But the Bulldogs seemed to come alive in the third quarter, mounting a long drive; however, Georgia's drive died in the shadow of the Gators' goal line when they were stuffed on fourth down, checking the Bulldogs momentarily but pinning the Gators deep in their own territory.  On the third play following the change of possession, Gators quarterback Kerwin Bell dropped back into his own end zone and lofted a long pass to streaking receiver Ricky Nattiel, who went 96 yards for a touchdown. The Bulldog momentum was snuffed out and the Gators went on to a convincing 27–0 victory, inspiring jubilant Florida fans to storm the field and tear down the goalposts after the final whistle.

1985: 'Dogs upset No. 1 Gators 

The 1985 Florida Gators entered the contest on a roll: coming off an emotional win over the Auburn Tigers, undefeated, and ranked No. 1 in the nation for the first time in school history.  This would not be a repeat of the 1984 game, however.  As they had done so many times in the past, the Bulldogs spoiled Florida's season, defeating the Gators 24–3 with freshmen running backs Keith Henderson and Tim Worley both rushing for over 100 yards. After the game, jubilant Georgia fans stormed the field and tore down the goalposts.

1993: Timeout 

In constant rain, the usually prolific passing game of coach Steve Spurrier's 1993 Florida Gators was stymied.  Instead, the Gators relied on tailback Errict Rhett to amass 183 yards and two touchdowns to build a 33–26 fourth-quarter lead.  Led by quarterback Eric Zeier, the Georgia Bulldogs mounted a drive into Florida territory in the final minute and a half.  Zeier completed what appeared to be the game-tying touchdown to Jerry Jerman with five seconds remaining in the game.  However, Gators cornerback Anthone Lott had called a timeout just before the ball was snapped, forcing the Bulldogs to play the down again.  Lott was called for pass interference on the ensuing play, giving Georgia one last untimed chance to score.  Zeier's final pass fell incomplete, and the Gators won a hard-fought, but controversial 33–26 victory.

1995: "Half a hundred between the Hedges" in Athens 
In the mid-1990s, the old Gator Bowl Stadium was rebuilt as Jacksonville Municipal Stadium for the expansion Jacksonville Jaguars of the NFL, temporarily moving the Florida-Georgia game to on-campus sites for the first time in over six decades Florida had soundly defeated Georgia at "The Swamp" in 1994, and an undefeated 1995 Florida Gators hoped to repeat the feat at Sanford Stadium against a struggling Georgia Bulldogs team led by soon-to-be-fired coach Ray Goff.

Gators starting quarterback Danny Wuerffel threw for 242 yards and five touchdowns before leaving the game in the third quarter.  With the Gators leading 38–17 in the fourth quarter, Gators backup quarterback Eric Kresser threw for two more touchdowns, one with 1:21 remaining, to make the final score 52–17.  After the game, Gators coach Steve Spurrier stated that he had wanted to be the first opponent to hang "half a hundred" on the Bulldogs in their own stadium because "we heard no one had ever done that before."  The Gators' fifty-two points remains the record for most scored against Georgia "between the hedges" that surround the Bulldog's home field.

2002: Gators upset No. 4 Bulldogs 

The 2002 Bulldogs brought a perfect 8–0 record and No. 4 ranking to the annual grudge match in Jacksonville.  Under new head coach Ron Zook, the Gators limped into the game with a 5–3 record and were unranked for the first time in over a decade. In a reversal of many Florida-Georgia games over the years, it was the underdog Gators who would ruin the Bulldogs' season.

Trailing 7–6, the Gators took the lead with a key play on defense.  Upon entering the contest in the second quarter, Bulldogs quarterback DJ Shockley was intercepted by Gators safety Guss Scott, who returned it for a touchdown, giving his team a 12–7 lead after a failed two-point conversion attempt.  The Bulldogs moved the ball but could not punch it into the endzone, settling for two field goals to take a halftime 13–12 lead.  The defenses continued to dominate in the second half, until an early fourth-quarter Gator drive ended with a touchdown pass from quarterback Rex Grossman and gave Florida a 20–13 advantage.  The Georgia offense failed to score again and failed to convert a third-down in thirteen attempts as Florida held on for the upset. This turned out to be Georgia's only loss of the season. They went 13–1 and won the SEC Championship and Sugar Bowl.

2007 – 2008: The "Gator Stomp" and the "Gator Stop"

2007
The 2007 game is remembered for the "Gator Stomp", a first-quarter mass celebration of the entire Georgia team in the Gators' endzone after Georgia running back Knowshon Moreno's scored the game's first touchdown early in the contest. Georgia coach Mark Richt later acknowledged that he had encouraged his players to draw an excessive celebration penalty after their first touchdown, but intended that only the eleven players on the field celebrate, not the entire team. Georgia received two unsportsmanlike conduct penalties for the celebration, moving the ensuing kickoff to their own 8-yard line, and Florida scored a touchdown on their next possession to tie the game at seven.  Still, the early celebration seemed to fire up the underdog Bulldogs. Moreno ran for 188 yards and Georgia's defense sacked Gators quarterback Tim Tebow six times, holding him to the lowest rushing total (−15 net yards) of his Heisman Trophy-winning season in the Bulldogs' 42–30 victory. The high-scoring game was the first in series history in which both teams scored thirty or more points.

2008
As the 2008 game approached, both coaches repeatedly stated that the previous year's incident would have no bearing on the contest.  Florida coach Urban Meyer went so far as to issue a gag order to his players, instructing them not to talk about the 2007 game with the media.  However, in his authorized biography published soon after the 2007 season, Meyer wrote: "That wasn't right.  It was a bad deal. . . .  We'll handle it, and it's going to be a big deal." The Bulldogs and Gators were both ranked in the top 10, and the winner would have the inside track in the SEC Eastern Division race and a possible shot at a national title.  Some commentators went so far as to call it the biggest match-up in the series history, or at least the previous 20 years.

Both offenses moved the ball with some effectiveness in the first half, but while the Gators scored two touchdowns, the Bulldogs were held to three field goal attempts and missed two of them. Georgia coach Mark Richt also called an unsuccessful onside kick after his team's made field goal, further blunting their momentum, and Florida held a 14–3 halftime lead. The Bulldogs turned the ball over four times in the second half and the Gators took advantage, pulling away for a 49–10 win in what was the Bulldogs' second worst loss in series history. In an apparent response to the Bulldogs' endzone celebration of the previous year, Meyer used both of his remaining timeouts with less than a minute to play, giving his team and fans more time to celebrate the sure victory.  After the game, he broke his pre-game silence on the 2007 celebration.  "Was it motivation for our players?  Yeah, it was."

Florida went on to win the SEC Championship Game and the BCS National Championship that season.

2012: Bulldogs upset No. 2 Gators 
The rivals came into their 2012 matchup with only one loss between them - Florida had a 7–0 record and a No. 2 ranking in the AP poll while Georgia was 6–1 and ranked No. 12 - once again making the game in Jacksonville a pivotal one for the teams' conference and national championship prospects, as South Carolina, the only other SEC East contender, already had 2 conference losses to LSU and Florida and was thus eliminated from SEC East contention. Both teams featured strong defenses and ball control offenses, so it was not a surprise that the contest was a low scoring one. Georgia running back Todd Gurley scored to cap the Bulldog's first possession and give his team an early 7–0 lead, but that would be the only touchdown for much of the game. With the defenses dominating and the offenses committing nine total turnovers between them, the rivals could only muster field goals for the next 40 minutes of game time, and Florida kicker Caleb Sturgis booted his third of the contest to cut Georgia's lead to 10–9 early in the 4th quarter.

Georgia's offense finally broke through with a 45-yard touchdown pass from Aaron Murray to Malcolm Mitchell, putting them up 17–9 midway through the final period. Florida's offense also found a rhythm with the game on the line, and quarterback Jeff Driskel led the Gators on a potential tying drive deep into Georgia territory. With just over two minutes remaining, he threw a strike over the middle to tight end Jordan Reed, who appeared to be headed for a touchdown before Bulldog outside line-backer Jarvis Jones punched the ball out of his hands. Georgia recovered in the back of the endzone for a touchback, and Florida's sixth turnover of the game allowed Georgia to hold on for the win. The teams finished the regular season tied for first in the SEC East with identical 7–1 records in conference play, but by virtue of their head-to-head victory over the Gators, the Bulldogs advanced to the SEC Championship game, where they lost to eventual BCS national champion Alabama.

Game results 

A The University of Georgia athletic association includes the 1904 game in the series win–loss record; the University of Florida's athletic association does not.  Please see the Series history section above for further explanation.

See also 

 List of NCAA college football rivalry games

References

Bibliography 

 2009 Southern Conference Football Media Guide, Year-by-Year Standings, Southern Conference, Spartanburg, South Carolina, pp. 74–77 (2009).
 2010 Southeastern Conference Football Media Guide, Southeastern Conference, Birmingham, Alabama, p. 60 (2010).
 2011 Florida Gators Football Media Guide, University Athletic Association, Gainesville, Florida, pp. 116–125 (2011).
 2011 Georgia Football Media Guide, University of Georgia Athletic Department, Athens, Georgia, pp. 157–168 (2011).
 Burns, Robbie, Belue to Scott!: The greatest moment in Georgia football history, H&H Publishing Company, Macon, Georgia (2010).  .
 Carlson, Norm, University of Florida Football Vault: The History of the Florida Gators, Whitman Publishing, LLC, Atlanta, Georgia (2007).  .
 Golenbock, Peter, Go Gators!  An Oral History of Florida's Pursuit of Gridiron Glory, Legends Publishing, LLC, St. Petersburg, Florida (2002).  .
 Hairston, Jack, Tales from the Gator Swamp: A Collection of the Greatest Gator Stories Ever Told, Sports Publishing, LLC, Champaign, Illinois (2002).  .
 McCarthy, Kevin M.,  Fightin' Gators: A History of University of Florida Football, Arcadia Publishing, Mount Pleasant, South Carolina (2000).  .
 McEwen, Tom, The Gators: A Story of Florida Football, The Strode Publishers, Huntsville, Alabama (1974).  .
 Nash, Noel, ed., The Gainesville Sun Presents The Greatest Moments in Florida Gators Football, Sports Publishing, Inc., Champaign, Illinois (1998).  .
 Rappoport, Ken, & Barry Wilner, Football Feuds: The Greatest College Football Rivalries, The Globe Pequot Press, Guilford, Connecticut (2007).  
 Saylor, Roger, "Southern Intercollegiate Athletic Association", College Football Historical Society, The LA84 Foundation (1993).
 Smith, Loran, University of Georgia Football Vault: The Story of the Georgia Bulldogs, 1892–2007, Whitman Publishing, LLC, Atlanta, Georgia (2007).  .

College football rivalries in the United States
Florida Gators football
Georgia Bulldogs football
Sports competitions in Jacksonville, Florida
American football in Jacksonville, Florida